Reba McEntire is the debut studio album by American country music singer Reba McEntire. It was released on August 15, 1977, by Mercury Records. It featured her first single "I Don't Want to Be a One Night Stand", as well as a cover of the Jennifer Warnes hit "Right Time of the Night", and the Hot hit "Angel in Your Arms". Three of the album's singles cracked the Billboard Country charts, but the album was not a commercial success, failing to chart.

McEntire signed with Mercury in November 1975 under producer Glenn Keener, who recorded one song with her in January 1976 in Nashville: "I Don't Want to Be a One Night Stand". Keener laid a sophisticated production style on the song, with lush strings and vocal chorus. "I Don't Want to Be a One Night Stand", was released as a single, climbing the country charts in May 1976 to peak at number 88. Coincidentally, McEntire married in June, 1976 and graduated from college in December, 1976. Mercury fired Keener during a period of downsizing, and McEntire was shifted to producer Jerry Kennedy. Kennedy supervised further recording sessions in September 1976 and April 1977. The second single, "(There's Nothing like the Love) Between a Woman and a Man", peaked at number 86 in March 1977, and the third single, "Glad I Waited Just For You" charted at number 88 in August at the same time as the album was released. None of these singles nor the album provided McEntire with royalty income—her advances and the label's production expenses were greater than sales receipts. McEntire saw her first royalty payment from the album in 1988, years after she left Mercury.

In a retrospective review, MusicHound criticized the album, saying this was "the sad sound of a naive 22-year-old singer overwhelmed by clunky, reverb-heavy production that employs backing singers with the subtlety of the cavalry." AllMusic praised the album, writing that it "rewards" the listener, even though fans of McEntire's contemporary sound would likely consider it too old-fashioned. Against her wishes, McEntire's next five albums with Mercury continued this heavy style of production. She began to take control of her sound after signing with MCA in 1983, delivering her most personal statement, My Kind of Country, in 1984.

Reba McEntire was re-issued on CD and cassette tape in 1993 and released digitally in 2012.

Track listing

Personnel 

 Reba McEntire – lead and backing vocals
 Bobby Emmons – acoustic piano, organ
 Hargus "Pig" Robbins – acoustic piano, organ
 Tommy Allsup – guitar
 Harold Bradley – guitar
 Ray Edenton – guitar
 Leon Rhodes – guitar
 Pete Wade – guitar
 Chip Young – guitar
 Lloyd Green – steel guitar
 Weldon Myrick – steel guitar
 Bob Moore – bass
 Buddy Harman – drums, percussion
 Charlie McCoy - harmonica
 Johnny Gimble – fiddle
 Billy Puett – saxophone
 Bergen White – string and flute arrangements, backing vocals
 Byron Bach – strings
 Brenton Banks – strings
 George Binkley III – strings
 John Catchings – strings
 Marvin Chantry – strings
 Roy Christensen – strings
 Virginia Christensen – strings
 Carl Gorodetzky – strings
 Lennie Haight – strings
 Martin Katahn – strings
 Sheldon Kurland – strings
 Steven Maxwell Smith – strings
 Chris Teal – strings
 Gary Vanosdale – strings
 Stephanie Woolf – strings
 Janie Fricke – backing vocals
 Hoyt Hawkins – backing vocals
 Ginger Holladay – backing vocals
 Mary Holladay – backing vocals
 Prissy Hubbard – backing vocals
 The Jordanaires – backing vocals
 Millie Kirkham – backing vocals
 Neal Matthews – backing vocals
 Louis Dean Nunley – backing vocals
 Gordon Stoker – backing vocals
 Ray C. Walker – backing vocals
 Trish Williams – backing vocals

Production 
 Jerry Kennedy – production 
 Glenn Keener – production 
 Larry Maglinger – engineer
 Lynn Peterzell – engineer
 Tom Sparkman – engineer
 Cam Mullins – mixing
 Bergen White – mixing 
 MC Rather – mastering
 Jim Schubert – artwork 
 Jim McGuire – photography

Charts
Singles – Billboard (North America)

References

1977 debut albums
Reba McEntire albums
Mercury Nashville albums
Albums produced by Jerry Kennedy